Nödinge-Nol is a locality and the seat of Ale Municipality in Västra Götaland County, Sweden. It had 9,822 inhabitants in 2010.

Overview
The town Nödinge-Nol was once three villages: Alafors, Nol and Nödinge. They have grown together into one locality. Nödinge community was originally called Kyrkby and has been the site of a church since medieval times. The current church was built in 1727 and has excellent murals.

Nödinge-Nol as a common village has been defined by the Central Bureau of Statistics, based on their principles. The Land Survey Place Name Unit still lists Nödinge, Nol and Alafors as three individual places.

The downtown area is dominated by apartment complexes and is surrounded by extensive countryside intermixed with villas. Downtown is Ale Torg, a shopping center with a diverse selection of stores. There is a junior high school, middle school, emergency room, library, a sports arena, a nine-hole golf course and a small boat harbor. The main public transport is Gothenburg commuter rail, which has two stations here, Nödinge and Nol and takes you to Gothenburg in about 15 minutes.

The surrounding countryside includes very steep hills around the river Göta Älv. The Göta Älv ridge to the east. Inside the town itself there are a large number of steep hills intermixed with flat valleys that today is fertile farmland, but which once was the sea bottom. The hills used to be islets of the old archipelago.

Ale is known for many things, best found on Ale Municipality page. Alafors for its brewery Ahlafors Bryggerier, Nol for the former industrial factories.

Nödinge in Ale was founded by a king called Inge. When fleeing from his enemies he swam with his horse over Göta Älv where he was helped. 
In gratitude, Inge founded Kirkby (kyrkby = church village) but when it started to form itself to a town it changed Its name to Nödinge. 
(Distress = Nöd, Inge = Inge, that becomes Nödinge (Inge was in need of help). This is based on folk etymology and is not the real meaning of the name.

References

Municipal seats of Västra Götaland County
Swedish municipal seats
Populated places in Västra Götaland County
Populated places in Ale Municipality